The Purple Rain Tour was a concert tour by American recording artist Prince and The Revolution following up on the success of his sixth studio album Purple Rain and his 1984 film Purple Rain. According to Spin, the tour sold over 1.7 million tickets.

History
The tour marked the live debut of the band now named The Revolution as Wendy Melvoin made her appearance as the new guitarist in Prince's band, taking over for the departed Dez Dickerson, completing the iconic line-up of the band.

In addition to Prince and The Revolution, they were joined on tour by Apollonia 6, and Sheila E. and her band. Despite gaining fame from their appearance in the film and releasing a third album, The Time were not invited to tour, as by 1985 the group had been depleted, with many of its remaining key members quitting to embark on personal careers.

Opening acts
Apollonia 6
Sheila E.

Set list
The Purple Rain Tour was the first Prince tour to open with brand new material. In this case, it was with the album opener, "Let's Go Crazy". A triple dose from the 1999 album followed: "Delirious",  "1999" and "Little Red Corvette".  An instrumental interlude of "Yankee Doodle" usually introduced another 1999 song, "Free".  The B-side "God" was often played, followed by a usual sequence of "Computer Blue", "Darling Nikki", "The Beautiful Ones" and "When Doves Cry" (featuring a mirror setup onstage to mimic the video of the song). As encores, the remaining Purple Rain songs closed the concert, "I Would Die 4 U", "Baby I'm a Star" and "Purple Rain". The three songs were extended, often taking 30 minutes to perform.  "Take Me with U" was often worked in, completing all the album tracks. Other songs sometimes included were "Father's Song", "How Come U Don't Call Me Anymore?", the new "Temptation", "Let's Pretend We're Married", "Irresistible Bitch" and "Do Me, Baby". On rare occasions, "International Lover", and some tracks from Dirty Mind (1980) and Prince (1979) would pop up. Later in the tour, an instrumental of "Under the Cherry Moon" was sometimes played. The B-side "Irresistible Bitch" was segued into the unreleased "Possessed" at the show in Syracuse.

Setlist of November 11, 1984, at the Joe Louis Arena, Detroit, Michigan, United States

 "Let's Go Crazy"
 "Delirious"
 "1999" (includes Reveille interpolation)
 "Little Red Corvette"
 Yankee Doodle (Instrumental Interlude)
 "Free"
 "Father's Song"
 "God"
 "Computer Blue"
 "Darling Nikki"
 "The Beautiful Ones" (includes 'backwards' "The Dance Electric"/wind chime intro)
 "When Doves Cry"
Encore 1 
 "I Would Die 4 U"
 "Baby I'm a Star"
Encore 2 
 "Purple Rain"

Setlist of November 22, 1984, at The Spectrum, Philadelphia, Pennsylvania, United States

 "Let's Go Crazy"
 "Delirious"
 "1999" (includes Reveille interpolation)
 "Little Red Corvette"
 Yankee Doodle (Instrumental Interlude)
 "Free"
 "Take Me with U"
 "How Come U Don't Call Me Anymore?"
 "Temptation"
 "Let's Pretend We're Married"/"International Lover"
 "God"
 "Computer Blue"
 "Darling Nikki"
 "The Beautiful Ones" (includes 'backwards' "The Dance Electric"/wind chime intro)
 "When Doves Cry"
Encore 1 
 "I Would Die 4 U"
 "Baby I'm a Star"
Encore 2 
 "Purple Rain"

Setlist of December 2, 1984, at the Maple Leaf Gardens, Toronto, Ontario, Canada

 "Let's Go Crazy"
 "Delirious"
 "1999" (includes Reveille interpolation)
 "Little Red Corvette"
 Yankee Doodle (Instrumental Interlude)
 "Under the Cherry Moon" (Instrumental)
 "Free"
 "Take Me with U"
 "Dirty Mind"
 "Do Me, Baby"
 "I Wanna Be Your Lover"
 "How Come U Don't Call Me Anymore?"
 "Temptation"
 "Let's Pretend We're Married"/"International Lover"
 "Father's Song"
 "God"
 "Computer Blue"
 "Darling Nikki"
 "The Beautiful Ones" (includes 'backwards' "The Dance Electric"/wind chime intro)
 "When Doves Cry"
Encore 1 
 <li value="20">"I Would Die 4 U"
 <li value="21">"Baby I'm a Star"
Encore 2 
 <li value="22">"Purple Rain"

Setlist of February 23, 1985, at The Forum, Inglewood, California, United States

 "Controversy"
 "Let's Go Crazy"
 "Delirious"
 "1999" (Includes ''[[Reveille]]'' interpolation)
 "Little Red Corvette"
 "Take Me with U" (Includes "[[Controversy (song)|Controversy]]" and "[[Apollonia 6 (album)|In a Spanish Villa]] (Instrumental)" interpolations)
 "When You Were Mine"
 "4 the Tears in Your Eyes"
 [[Yankee Doodle]] (Instrumental Interlude)
 <li value="9">"A Case of You"
 <li value="10">"Free"
 <li value="11">"Raspberry Beret"
 <li value="12">"Do Me, Baby" (Includes 'purple house' spoken intro)
 <li value="13">"Irresistible Bitch"
 <li value="14">"Temptation"
 <li value="15">"Let's Pretend We're Married" / "International Lover"
 <li value="16">"God"
 <li value="17">"Computer Blue"
 <li value="18">"Darling Nikki"
 <li value="19">"The Beautiful Ones" (Includes 'backwards' "[[André Cymone|The Dance Electric]]" / wind chime intro)
 <li value="20">"When Doves Cry"
Encore 1
 <li value="21">"I Would Die 4 U"
 <li value="22">"Baby I'm a Star" (Includes "We are Young" chant & "[[Bodyheat]]" and "Partyup" interpolations)
 <li value="23">"America"
Encore 2 
 <li value="24">"Purple Rain"

Notes
 During performances of "I Would Die 4 U"/"Baby I'm a Star", Prince would often invite Apollonia 6 and Sheila E. to jam with him for a 20-to-30-minute rendition of the songs.
 At the Landover, Maryland concert, the performance of "I Would Die 4 U"/"Baby I'm a Star" were recorded and used as a promo video for the song played on MTV.
 The Syracuse, New York concert on March 30, 1985 was recorded and released on VHS later in 1985.
 Singers Bruce Springsteen and Madonna joined Prince on stage during "Baby I'm a Star" at the February 23, 1985 concert at The Forum in Inglewood, California.
 A little-known fact is that Prince performed his Purple Rain Concert a month before its first scheduled date in Detroit in a concert hall called "Bogarts" on Sept. 23, 1984 in Cincinnati, Ohio.  It was hinted on the local Urban Contemporary station, WBLZ, but only a few individuals knew that he would actually show up.  He played a full set for a crowd of 2,500 as a trial run, and even Morris Day and Sheila E. were present.

Tour dates

Personnel
 Prince: Lead vocals, guitar, tambourine and keyboards
 Wendy Melvoin: Guitar
 Brown Mark: Bass
 Matt Fink: Keyboards
 Lisa Coleman: Keyboards
 Bobby Z.: Drums

During this tour, Prince added saxophonists Eric Leeds and Eddie Minnifield to certain parts of the show and often they would join The Revolution on stage for the extended jams of "I Would Die 4 U" and "Baby I'm a Star". A minor conflict arose within the band, as Prince began giving Leeds lengthy solos during other songs, in particular Wendy was upset that her opening guitar solo on the show closing "Purple Rain" was given to Leeds.

Tour photographer was Nancy Bundt.

Notes

References

Prince (musician) concert tours
1984 concert tours
1985 concert tours